CBC News: Politics was a Canadian political affairs television series which aired weekdays on CBC Newsworld, which was hosted by Don Newman. The show was discontinued and replaced with an additional hour of CBC News: Today upon Newman's retirement in 2009; in the fall, the new series Power & Politics, hosted by Evan Solomon, debuted.

References

External links
 CBC News: Politics

CBC News Network original programming
2009 Canadian television series endings
2000s Canadian television news shows